Alberto Martinez Piedra (January 29, 1926 – December 20, 2021) was the David E. Bentley Professor of Political Economy at The Institute of World Politics.

Dr. Piedra was the Director of the Latin American Institute at The Catholic University of America from 1965 to 1982. He was the United States Ambassador to Guatemala (1984–1987).

Piedra has three doctorates - Doctor in Law, 1951, University of Havana; University of Madrid (1957), and Georgetown University (1962). He was Director General of Exports and Imports of the Cuban Ministry of Commerce in 1959; and Technical Assistant of the Department of Economic Development of the Cuban National Council from 1958 to 1959. He was a Staff Economist at the OAS from 1960 to 1962.

References

1926 births
2021 deaths
Ambassadors of the United States to Guatemala
Cuban emigrants to the United States
Catholic University of America faculty
Georgetown University alumni
Hispanic and Latino American diplomats
The Institute of World Politics faculty